Synnøve Macody Lund (born 24 May 1976) is a Norwegian journalist, film critic, model, and actress. , she appears in the 2020 Netflix series Ragnarok and the 2020 Sky TV series Riviera.

Early life
Lund was born on 24 May 1976 in Stord, Norway. She has a degree in television production and film studies.

Career
Lund has worked as a film critic for NATT&DAG (Norwegian; translation, Night&Day), and as a journalist, after earlier work as a fashion model. She has been working as an actress since 2011, appearing first as the character Diana Brown in Morten Tyldum's BAFTA Award film Headhunters (Norwegian, Hodejegerne), an action thriller based on the 2008 Jo Nesbø novel of the same name. The BAFTA Award nomination was for Best Foreign Language Film. Lund's entry into acting is described, thus, by Headhunters co-star Aksel Hennie: "When I first read the script I pictured Synnove because I knew her from before and she had reviewed every single film I've done and Morten (the director) asked me, 'Is she a film critic? Yeah. Has she reviewed any of my films? Yeah. Was the review good? Yeah. OK then we can try her', So we tried her and she came so prepared — more prepared than any actress."

Her subsequent roles have included the role of Sara in the short Sandslottet (2014), and as the character Tonje Sandvik in the drama series Frikjent (2015) alongside Nicolai Cleve Broch. She appears as the murderous Johanne Rønningen in Black Widows (2016), a remake of the Finnish series Mustat Lesket, currently in distribution by Acorn TV and is mentioned with regard to future roles in the James Bond movie franchise.

She holds the role of Gabriella Grane in the 2018 film The Girl in the Spider's Web, based on the novel of the same name by David Lagercrantz, which in turn is based on characters in the book series by Stieg Larsson.

, there was a report that Lund had contracted with the publisher Samlaget to produce a novel, on subjects that were at the time undisclosed. Her novel "Personar du kanskje kjenner" (translation "People you may know") was published in 2016.

In December 2022, Lund was confirmed by Deadline Hollywood to have signed on to appear in Saw X, the upcoming tenth installment of the Saw film series, set for release in October 2023.

Filmography

Feature films
 Headhunters (2011), Diana Brown
 Askeladden - I Dovregubbens Hall (2017), Queen Victoria
 The Girl in the Spider's Web (2018), Gabriella Grane
 Saw X (2023)

Short films
 Sandslottet (2014), Sara

Television
 Frikjent (2015-2016), Tonje Sandvik
 Black Widows (2016-2017), Johanne Rønningen
 Illegals (2018), Linda Boman
 Bloodride (Episode 3) (2020), author
 Riviera (2020)
 Ragnarok (2020-Present), Ran

Video games
 Battlefield V (2018), Astrid Bjørnstad

References

External links

 Synnøve Macody Lund on Panorama Agency
 

1976 births
Norwegian film actresses
People from Stord
21st-century Norwegian actresses
Living people